Murexsul mariae is a species of medium-sized sea snail, a predatory marine gastropod mollusc in the Family Muricidae, the murex snails or rock snails.

Distribution
It occurs along the coast of North Island, New Zealand.

References

 Powell A. W. B., William Collins Publishers Ltd, Auckland 1979 

Muricidae
Gastropods of New Zealand
Gastropods described in 1930
Taxa named by Harold John Finlay